The General Electric YJ93 turbojet engine was designed as the powerplant for both the North American XB-70 Valkyrie bomber and the North American XF-108 Rapier interceptor. The YJ93 was a single-shaft axial-flow turbojet with a variable-stator compressor and a fully variable convergent/divergent exhaust nozzle.

Design and development

The YJ93 started life as the General Electric J79-X275, an enlarged version of the General Electric J79 turbojet with "275" meaning Mach 2.75, the engine's target operating speed. This design evolved into the X279 when Mach 3 cruise became a requirement, and ultimately became the YJ93.

The engine used a special high-temperature JP-6 fuel. The first engine went on test in September 1958 and featured advanced technology achievements such as electrolytically drilling longitudinal air cooling holes in the turbine blades.

The XF-108 interceptor was cancelled outright, and the B-70 project was re-oriented to a research project only.

Variants
J93-GE-1  thrust with afterburner.
J93-GE-3 Production variant produced in small numbers for the North American XB-70 Valkyrie programme.
J93-GE-3R Variant with thrust reverser,  thrust with afterburner.
J93-GE-3AR Variant intended for the North American XF-108 Rapier.

Applications
 Convair NB-58A Hustler (testbed)
 North American XB-70 Valkyrie
 North American XF-108 Rapier (intended)

Specifications (J93-GE-3)

See also

References

 

1950s turbojet engines
YJ93
Abandoned military aircraft engine projects of the United States